Casila Abdul Samed "Sinhala" Marikkar (5 July 1911 - 18 November 1970) was a Sri Lankan politician. He served as Minister for Post, Broadcasting and Communication from 1956 until 1960 in the S. W. R. D. Bandaranaike cabinet and Dahanayake cabinet, and was a member of parliament representing the Sri Lanka Freedom Party (SLFP) from Kadugannawa.

Early life and education
Marikkar was born in the village of Hewaheta in the Central Province of Ceylon to P. C. Marikar, a businessman, and Mohideen Natchiya Marikar from Udadeniya Madige. He received his primary education under Rev. Heenatiyana Seelarathna Thera at the Sri Abhayaraja Pirivena in Kadugannawa. Then moved to Dharmaraja College Kandy for his secondary education. Marikkar went on to study law at the Ceylon Law College, in Colombo.

Political career 

Joining the Ceylon  National Congress, Marikkar first contested the 1947 general election from Galaha and came fourth. He joined the Sri Lanka Freedom Party at its formation in 1951 along with his brother, A. C Marikar. He contested the 1952 general election from Kadugannawa representing the Sri Lanka Freedom Party and was elected to parliament as the second member from Kadugannawa.

Dasa Laksha pethsama  
In 1954, upon hearing of the Royal tour of Ceylon by the Queen Elizabeth II, Marikar and Henry Abeywickrema gained 1 million signatures of the public for a petition against the upcoming visit. His opposition was on the basis that if Ceylon was truly independent why should it invite the monarchy to tour the country, although under the Constitution of Ceylon, Queen Elizabeth II was the country's formal head of state, as the Monarch of Ceylon. The government in order to avoid any potential disruptions placed Marikar and Abeywickrama under house arrest for the duration of the Royal tour.

Minister of Post, Broadcasting and Communication 

As a gifted orator, he was instrumental in the Sri Lanka Freedom Party's victory at the 1956 general election, working the crowds before public appearances of party chief, S. W. R. D. Bandaranaike. He contested the election in the seat of Kadugannwa and was elected the first member for the electorate receiving 42,982 votes (41% of the total vote). Prime Minister Bandaranaike appointed Marikkar to his cabinet as the Minister for Post, Broadcasting and Communication. In his ministerial role he recommended that Bandaranaike to censor Voice of America transmissions into Ceylon. In 1959 he rode to a party convention on the back of an elephant, creating a diversion from those that were gathered to criticise the Bandaranaike government.

In September 1959, Bandaranayake was assassinated, following which he continued his role in the cabinet of the caretaker Prime Minister W. Dahanayake. In December following the dismissal of several ministers, Marikkar received the additional portfolios of Cultural Affairs and Social Services.  Following the Delimitation Commission's decision to divide the Kadugannawa electorate he nominated for the seat of Galagedara. On 4 January 1960, he was dismissed from cabinet with five other ministers who had given nominations from the Sri Lanka Freedom Party. Marikkar was elected at the March 1960 general election, as the member for Galagedara accumulating 4,493 votes. Marikar did not contest the subsequent general elections in July as he was not in favour of Sirimavo Bandaranaike leading the party.

Walter Thalagodapitiya Commission 

Prior to Bandaranayake's death, on 11 September 1959, the Governor General of Ceylon Sir Oliver Goonetilleke appointed a Commission of Inquiry consisting of Walter Thalgodapitiya, Thomas Webb Roberts and Samuel John Charles Schokman. The Thalagodapitiya Commission terms of reference were to inquire into allegations of bribery and corruption against members of parliament. The Report of the Parliamentary Bribery Commission (Thalagodapitiya Commission) was tabled on 16 December 1960 and found Marikkar, M. P. de Zoysa, D. B. Monnekulame, Henry Abeywickrema, M. S. Kariapper and Robert Edward Jayatilaka guilty of bribery. Following the 1965 general election, the new national government, revisited the Thalagodapitiya Commission Report and enacted the Imposition Of Civic Disabilities (Special Provisions) Act (No. 14 of 1965) which stripped Marikkar along with de Zoysa, Abeywickrema, Kariapper, Jayatilleke, and Monnekulame of their civic rights for a period of seven years. Marikkar died on 18 November 1970, at the age of 59.

References 

Posts ministers of Sri Lanka
Members of the 2nd Parliament of Ceylon
Members of the 3rd Parliament of Ceylon
Members of the 4th Parliament of Ceylon
Sri Lanka Freedom Party politicians
Sri Lankan Moor politicians
1911 births
Year of death missing
Sri Lankan politicians convicted of crimes
Alumni of Dharmaraja College